Nordenberg is a surname. Notable people with the surname include:

 Bengt Nordenberg (1822–1902), Swedish artist who belonged to the Düsseldorf school of painting
 Mark Nordenberg (born 1948), Chancellor emeritus of the University of Pittsburgh and chair of the university's Institute of Politics
 Pontus Nordenberg (born 1995), Swedish footballer

See also:
 Nordenberg Hall, University Office Place